Neil D. Opdyke (February 7, 1933 – April 7, 2019) was an American geologist. 

He was the Distinguished Professor Emeritus in the Department of Geological Sciences at the University of Florida in Gainesville, Florida, United States. He was previously with Lamont-Doherty Geological Observatory of Columbia University, including a stint as Director.  He was well known for his groundbreaking research in the 1950s on paleoclimate and continental drift, with Keith Runcorn, and later in Africa and Australia with Mike McElhinny and others. Back the U.S. in the mid-1960s he worked on the documentation of magnetic reversals in deep-sea sediments, which led to proof of the Vine–Matthews–Morley hypothesis the governing paradigm for marine magnetic anomalies.

In 1969, Dr. Opdyke & Ken Henry used marine core data for a convincing test of the GAD
hypothesis that is central to the use of paleomagnetism in continental
reconstruction. Opdyke’s work with Nick Shackleton in 1973 marked the
beginning of the integration of oxygen isotope stratigraphy and
magnetostratigraphy that has led to current methods of tuning
timescales. Neil pioneered magnetic stratigraphy in terrestrial
(non-marine) sediments and produced some of the most impressive records, notably from Pakistan and southwestern United States. These studies led to a vastly improved time frame for vertebrate evolution and allowed the documentation of mammal migration.

Research interests 
 Paleomagnetism and its application to tectonics and magnetostratigraphy.
Paleoclimatology and paleogeography of the Phanerozoic.

Education 
 B.A., Columbia University, 1955
 D.Sc., University of Newcastle upon Tyne, 1982
 Ph.D., Durham University, England, 1958

Memberships and distinctions 
 European Geosciences Union Petrus Peregrinus Medal 2008 for pioneering work in magnetic stratigraphy of marine and continental sediments and its contribution to our understanding of the history of the magnetic field and its geological applications.
 National Academy of Sciences, 1996
 American Academy of Arts and Sciences, 1998
 Geological Society of America, fellow
 American Association for the Advancement of Science, Fellow
 American Geophysical Union, Fellow
 American Geophysical Union John Adam Fleming Medal 1996

References

External links 

 Oral history interview transcript with Neil D. Opdyke on 17 March 1997, American Institute of Physics, Niels Bohr Library & Archives - Session I
 Oral history interview transcript with Neil D. Opdyke on 11 July 1997, American Institute of Physics, Niels Bohr Library & Archives - Session II

1933 births
2019 deaths
American geologists
Columbia College (New York) alumni
Columbia University faculty
University of Florida faculty
Fellows of the American Geophysical Union
Fellows of the American Association for the Advancement of Science
Fellows of the Geological Society of America
Members of the United States National Academy of Sciences
Alumni of King's College, Newcastle